Zamia amazonum is a species of plant in the family Zamiaceae. It is found in Belize, Colombia, Peru, and Venezuela. It is threatened by habitat loss.

References

amazonum
Near threatened plants
Taxonomy articles created by Polbot